Liverpool City Council is the governing body for the city of Liverpool in Merseyside, England. It consists of 90 councillors, three for each of the city's 30 wards.

The council is currently controlled by the Labour Party and is led by Mayor Joanne Anderson. It is a constituent council of Liverpool City Region Combined Authority.

History
Liverpool has been a town since 1207 when it was granted its first charter by King John. It has had a town corporation (the Corporation of Liverpool) since before the 19th century, and this was one of the corporations reformed by the Municipal Corporations Act 1835.

Municipal Council
In 1835, Liverpool expanded into the village of Everton and then the township of Kirkdale in the 1860s. The corporation created a police force in 1836.

Liverpool was granted city status in 1880. When elected county councils were established in 1889 under the Local Government Act 1888, Liverpool was one of the cities to become a county borough, and thus administratively independent of Lancashire County Council, although the city remained part of Lancashire for ceremonial purposes until 1974.

In 1892 the city was given a Lord Mayor.

In 1895, Wavertree, Walton and parts of Toxteth and West Derby were incorporated into the city. Fazakerley (1904) and Gateacre (1913) followed, then the rest of West Derby known as West Derby Rural in 1928 and finally Speke in 1932.

Liverpool's first female councillor was Eleanor Rathbone, elected in 1909. Eighteen years later, Margaret Beavan became the first female Lord Mayor in 1927.

In the late nineteenth and early twentieth centuries, the council was run by the Conservatives, whose policies were responsible for Liverpool leading the way in many areas of social reform, for example, the provision of the first council-housing in Europe. Labour councillors were first elected to the council in 1905, but Liverpool was one of the last major cities in the UK in which the Labour Party gained control, which occurred in 1955. The Conservatives were able to briefly regain control in 1961, until 1963, and again in 1967 until 1972.

In 1974 Liverpool became a metropolitan borough within the new county of Merseyside. In 1986, the Merseyside County Council was abolished and its functions devolved to its districts, including Liverpool. Since 1986 Merseyside has continued to legally exist as a ceremonial county, but without a county council.

Liberal followed by Militant-dominated Labour
In the late 1970s, the city was run by the Liberal Party under Sir Trevor Jones. As part of their plans, a cost-cutting exercise was drawn up, to reduce the council's costs by 25%. In 1979, the Conservative Party won the general election. The new government intended to cut council spending but Liverpool City Council successfully negotiated an exception from this, on the grounds that they were already following government policy and cutting 25%.

During the 1980s, the Trotskyist Militant group gained control of Liverpool's Labour Party and the council, and attempted to challenge the national government on several issues including refusing to set a budget in 1985. The council then adopted a 'deficit budget' in which spending exceeded income, causing a financial crisis. The leadership of the Labour Party was drawn into the controversy, culminating with Neil Kinnock's speech to the Party Conference in 1985, denouncing Liverpool City Council without explicitly naming it. Derek Hatton, councillor for Netherley ward and Deputy Leader of the council, shouted "lies" at the platform, and Eric Heffer, MP for Liverpool Walton constituency, left the conference platform.

The Labour Party ultimately succeeded in expelling members of Militant, and Hatton himself was expelled from the Labour Party in June 1986.

1990–2010 

1998 The Liberal Democrats win control of Liverpool City Council, led by Mike Storey
2001 Paradise Project is unveiled as a plan to transform Chavasse Park in the city centre with creation of new retail complex – to be called Liverpool ONE. 
2003 Liverpool win the UK nomination of European Capital of Culture for 2008.
2004 Liverpool's waterfront and parts of the city centre are given World Heritage status.
2005 Liverpool Culture Company is established to deliver city's 800th anniversary in 2007 and European Capital of Culture in 2008.
2005 in November Lib Dem leader of the Council Mike Storey resigns after eight years following accusations of plotting to try to engineer departure of Council's Chief Executive, Sir David Henshaw.
2005 Storey was replaced as leader by Warren Bradley. Sir David Henshaw retired and was replaced as chief executive by Colin Hilton.
2005 Liverpool City Council issue a formal apology for the flooding of Capel Celyn, near Bala, North Wales. The community was destroyed and the land flooded to create Llyn Celyn in 1965. The reservoir was solely created to supply water to Liverpool and Wirral.
2007 Council owned St George's Hall reopens after £23m restoration programme.
2007 Liverpool celebrates 800th anniversary on 28 August.
2007 Council owned Liverpool Cruise Terminal is opened.
2008 Liverpool officially launches its year as European Capital of Culture on 11 January with a "people's party" outside St George's Hall, attended by more than 40,000 people. On 12 January the Liverpool Echo Arena, which is owned by the council, was officially opened with a concert featuring Liverpool music bands past and present.
2008 Council awarded 1 star by Audit Commission.
2008 Liberal Democrats lose overall control of the city on 1 May in local elections, however a midnight defection of an Independent (former Labour) councillor gives them a majority of 1.
2008 Green Party take the second seat in St Michael's ward, becoming a recognisable "group" on the council.
2009 The council announces a major shake up of middle management.

2010–present 

2010 The Labour party win control of the council for the first time in 12 years, with Joe Anderson becoming the new council leader
2010 The Liverpool Schools Investment Programme (LSIP) was created in response to UK government scrapping Building Schools for the Future. £180m was invested over an eight-year period, transforming 22 of the city's primary and secondary schools – including 15 new builds.
2011 The Labour Party's Jake Morrison, aged 18, defeats Lord Mike Storey after 38 years service
2012 The Labour Party's Joe Anderson was elected as the first Mayor for Liverpool for a four-year term.
2013 Council owned Liverpool Central Library reopens after £50m renovation.
2014 Liverpool became part of the Liverpool City Region Combined Authority, covering the five Merseyside districts plus Halton.
2015 Joe Anderson instructs city council lawyers to help him launch legal proceedings against Chesterfield High School after it terminated his £4,500 per year role. The council spent £90,000 of public money on the case, described by the tribunal judge as a 'private' matter.
2016 Joe Anderson was re-elected as Mayor of Liverpool for a four-year term.
2016 Council established Paddington Village – a £1bn development site to attract world-class scientific research and tech firms in the city's Knowledge Quarter. The Royal College of Physicians announced it will base its Northern HQ in Paddington Village.
2016 Joe Anderson announced intention to run for Labour nomination for Metro Mayor of Liverpool City Region. Steve Rotheram, Walton MP, was nominated.
2017 Joe Anderson announced intention to run for Labour nomination to be MP for Walton. Dan Carden was nominated.
2017 Council lead city's bid to host 2022 Commonwealth Games. UK Government chose Birmingham to host games.
2017 Council announced a new cruise terminal is to be situated in Liverpool Waters, with an estimated opening set for 2021–22.
2017 Chief executive Ged Fitzgerald arrested on suspicion of conspiracy to pervert the course of justice and witness intimidation.
2018 Council established an "ethical housing company", called Foundations, to deliver 10,000 new homes over the next decade.
2018 Liverpool bid to be new Headquarters for Channel 4. The city is shortlisted but Leeds is chosen.
2018 Labour lose 3 seats to the Liberal Democrats. In wake of the election result, Assistant Mayor Nick Small was sacked. Deputy Mayor Ann O'Byrne resigned in protest. Wendy Simon was appointed Deputy Mayor.
2019 Labour lose 2 seats to the Liberal Democrats and 1 to Liberal Party. As polls close Ann O'Byrne, Deputy Leader of the Group posts motion to rescind directly elected Mayoral model. Motion is not voted at party AGM, but party agrees to host a review of the structure. O'Byrne loses vote to remain as Deputy Leader, which is won by Wendy Simon.
2019 Liverpool City Council is chosen as the UK's No1 event organiser – and the only council to feature in World's top 30 list of the EventEx Awards.
2019 Labour councillor Paul Kenyon resigns his Picton (ward) seat citing Jeremy Corbyn's failure to adequately deal with abuse directed towards him by party members and to protect Wavertree MP Luciana Berger from anti-Semitic abuse 
2019 Labour councillor Dave Cummings is suspended by the Labour Party for making sexist comments about Labour MEP Theresa Griffin. He is later convicted of criminal damage, but refuses to resign his position.
2019 Council's head of regeneration, Nick Kavanagh, and director of property developer Elliot Group, Elliot Lawless, arrested by Merseyside Police for a number of alleged offences including conspiracy to defraud, misconduct in public office and bribery.  Their arrests were later quashed after a High Court review.  Neither man was charged.
2020 It is reported the city council's public accounts since 2015 have not been certified by auditors due to the 'ongoing complex police investigation' involving the council's former chief executive.   
2020 Labour councillor Sam Gorst is suspended by the Labour Party for inappropriate conduct on social media. The vocal Jeremy Corbyn supporter had been involved in previous allegations of antisemitism.
2020 Nick Kavanagh is re-arrested for alleged bribery-related offences, together with four others, regarding alleged preferential sale of several sites in Liverpool city centre to Elliot Group.
2020 Joe Anderson, Liverpool city's mayor, arrested on suspicion of conspiracy to commit bribery and witness intimidation as part of a police investigation into the award of construction contracts in Liverpool.
2021 Robert Jenrick, Secretary of State for Housing, Communities and Local Government, says following an investigation into the council's wrongdoings the UK Government will be appointing Commissioners who will oversee authority and carry out limited functions of the council for at least 3 years.
2021 Elections: Joanne Anderson is elected as Mayor of Liverpool. Labour lose three seats to the Liberal Democrats.
2022 Six Labour councillors are suspended by the party for refusing to vote for budget cuts. Five of these councillors join with three previously suspended councillors to form the Liverpool Community Independents. On the same day Alan Tormey defects from the Liberal Democrats to the Liberal Party.

Arrest of council chief executive
In May 2017, Gerard ('Ged') Fitzgerald, then the council's chief executive, and three others were arrested by Lancashire Police on suspicion of conspiracy to pervert the course of justice and witness intimidation.  It followed investigations into financial irregularities relating to 'One Connect', a partnership between Lancashire County Council and British Telecom (BT) set up during Fitzgerald's tenure as Lancashire council chief executive. Lancashire county council had aborted a procurement exercise relating to the potential outsourcing of Lancashire county council's vehicle fleet to British Telecom, an action that was investigated in 2013 by a firm of solicitors, DAC Beachcroft and later the police.

One of the others arrested at the time was Geoffrey Driver, then Lancashire council leader and leader of its Conservative party group.  The warrants for the men's arrests stated that evidence had been gathered that between 2013 and 2015 Mr. Driver in collusion with the three others had been "involved in activity directed toward a number of principal witnesses ... which was clearly designed to intimidate, belittle and undermine them both professionally and, crucially, as witnesses in the investigation".  The witnesses reportedly included four people who held Lancashire county council roles, including as treasurer, auditor and as a councillor.

In September 2017, it was reported Fitzgerald had been suspended, following a Liverpool council disciplinary panel meeting. In December 2017, Fitzgerald applied for a judicial review of his arrest, but in April 2018, the High Court refused. In its judgment, the court said one ground for refusing his application was that the scope of an earlier investigation by Lancashire police – dubbed Operation Sheridan – that had led to his arrest had "widened to include alleged criminality within Liverpool City Council and the Merseyside Pension Fund (MPF)". In May 2018, Fitzgerald resigned from his Liverpool city council role with immediate effect. He remained on police bail.

The High Court judgment was critical of the 2017 application for arrest warrants presented by D.C. Fishwick of Lancashire Police, which "ran to 29 pages with another 27 pages of appendices" and was described as "not easy to summarise ... presented as it was ... as an impenetrable, discursive mass lacking a discernible sense of order. Understandably, the police are concerned to comply with their duty as to disclosure; but the answer to that obligation does not lie in simply "throwing" material at the Court in the manner in which it was done in this case".  The Lancashire police investigation into the financial irregularities started in 2013 and was reported to have cost in excess of £2m by May 2017.

Lancashire county council's 'One Connect' was reportedly similar to 'Liverpool Direct', a partnership set up between Liverpool city council and BT, which was later bought out entirely by the council.  David McElhinney, who was one of the men arrested in May 2017, had been chief executive of both Liverpool and Lancashire council's joint ventures with BT at various times.

In August 2018, a case file of evidence gathered on Mr Fitzgerald and two other ex-council executives was handed to the Crown Prosecution Service.

In June 2020, it was reported Liverpool city council's accounts since 2015 had not been signed off by its auditors, Grant Thornton, on account of the 'complex ongoing police investigation'. The Crown Prosecution Service said the file was still being considered. Lancashire Police declined to comment.

Mayors and leadership
The Lord Mayor of Liverpool is the first citizen and chosen representative of the city, acting as a focal point for the community as well as promoting the city. This is a different role to that of the directly elected Mayor of Liverpool. The Lord Mayor's main responsibilities include meeting delegates from twinned cities, chairing council meetings and representing the city. The Lord Mayor of Liverpool is always a serving councillor, elected by the full council at its Annual General Meeting held each May, and usually serve for a term of one year.

By contrast, the Mayor of Liverpool is the council's political leader, being a directly elected mayor. The directly elected mayor position in Liverpool was created in 2012, and the current mayor, elected in 2021 is Joanne Anderson of the Labour. The directly elected mayor position is due to be abolished in 2023 with the council reverting to having a leader of the council chosen from the elected councillors as the political leader, as had been the case prior to 2012.

As a constituent district within the Liverpool City Region Combined Authority, Liverpool also has a third type of mayor, the Metro Mayor of the Liverpool City Region.

Political makeup

Elections are usually by thirds, in three of every four years.  2004 saw new boundaries and a reduction in the number of councillors from 99 to 90, so all seats were contested.

In March 2007, Labour gained a seat from the Liberal Democrats in a by-election in Speke Garston ward. In the May 2007 council elections, the Liberal Democrats lost 4 seats to Labour, leaving the council make-up as Liberal Democrats 51, Labour 35, Liberals 3 and Greens 1.

Labour then won the second by-election in Warbreck ward in September 2007.

In May 2010, the Labour Party, led by Joe Anderson, gained control of the council for the first time in 12 years. In May 2011, Labour increased their majority on the Council making 11 gains.

At the May 2012 elections, Labour won 27 seats and the Liberal Democrats, Green Party and Liberals 1 each. This made the composition of the Council 72 Labour (after one councillor became an independent), 9 Liberal Democrat (after defection to the Labour party), 3 Liberal, 2 green and 2 independents.

In the May 2014 elections, the Labour party won 27 seats, the Green party won 2 seats, and the Liberal party won 1 seat. This made the composition of the council for 2014/15: 78 Labour, 4 Green, 3 Liberal Democrat, 3 Liberal, and 2 independent.

Council wards
Liverpool is split into 30 separate wards for elections. These are the wards since the 2004 local elections.

Between 1953 and 1973 the wards of Liverpool City Council were
Abercromby, Aigburth, Allerton, Anfield, Arundel, Breckfield, Broadgreen, Central, Childwall, Church, Clubmoor, County, Croxteth, Dingle, Dovecot, Everton, Fairfield, Fazakerley, Gillmoss, Granby, Kensington, Low Hill, Melrose, Netherfield, Old Swan, Picton, Pirrie, Princess Park, St Domingo, St James, St Mary's, St Michaels, Smithdown, Speke, Sandhills, Tuebrook, Vauxhall, Warbreck, Westminster, Woolton. Each ward returned three councillors and was represented by an Alderman, bringing to the total number of representatives on the City Council to 120.

In 1973, the whole council was reconstituted and the number of wards was reduced to 33. Each ward elected three councillors, and the aldermanic system was abolished.

Premises

Council meetings are held at Liverpool Town Hall at the junction of High Street, Dale Street and Water Street, which was built between 1749 and 1754. The council's main administrative offices are located in the Cunard Building at Pier Head.  From 1868 until 2016 the council's main offices were the Municipal Buildings on Dale Street. The Municipal Buildings were sold in 2016 after the council decided they were too large and costly to maintain for the council.

Allegations against, or criticism of, council officers

Bribery allegations involving Nick Kavanagh and Elliot Lawless 
On 18 December 2019, Nick Kavanagh, Liverpool council's then regeneration chief and Elliot Lawless, head of property development company Elliot Group, were arrested by Merseyside Police on suspicion of a number of alleged offences including conspiracy to defraud, misconduct in public office and bribery, reported the Liverpool Echo newspaper.  The charges related to "the sale of council land and building property" in the "Georgian quarter and Toxteth" and the allegation that "Mr Lawless was able to secure two sites on an 'improperly preferential basis'", according to a consent order obtained in a High Court application by the newspaper.

Both were reportedly released on bail in March 2020. No charges were brought against them and their arrest warrants were quashed, with the police reportedly citing "technical difficulties". Mr Lawless had applied for a High Court review of the arrests, which found in April 2020 that a search of Mr Lawless’ home shortly before his arrest had been unlawful. The proceedings were reportedly "concluded by consent" between Merseyside Police and Mr Lawless. However, a police statement noted an investigation would continue and that it retained £337,342.00 and €10,442.10 in cash seized from property and vehicles connected to Mr Lawless under the Proceeds of Crime Act, and "copies of exhibits seized" at the time of the arrests. Mr Lawless denies any wrong-doing. Mr Kavanagh has reportedly not spoken publicly since his arrest. On 11 May 2020, the Echo reported Liverpool council had suspended Mr. Kavanagh.

On 3 September 2020, Mr. Kavanagh was reportedly re-arrested on suspicion of conspiracy to commit bribery, together with four others.

On 7 September 2020, Merseyside Police was granted permission to retain the cash seized in December 2019 for a further 90 days, the third such successful extension request.

Council lawyers costs – Joe Anderson employment tribunal 

In April 2015, Liverpool Echo reported Mayor Joe Anderson had instructed Liverpool City Council lawyers to assist him in a legal dispute he was bringing against Chesterfield High School for unfair dismissal. The school had dismissed Anderson after he had not worked at the school for two years.  The council spent over £89,500 from public funds to support Anderson's application to the employment tribunal over two and a half years. The initial tribunal found the school was within its rights to terminate Anderson's contract, however they had not followed the correct procedure to do so.  Anderson appealed against the finding but lost.

Arrest of Joe Anderson on suspicion of bribery and witness intimidation 
On 5 December 2020, Joe Anderson was arrested on suspicion of conspiracy to commit bribery and witness intimidation, as part of a police investigation, dubbed Operation Aloft, into alleged fraud in the awarding of construction contracts in the Liverpool city area.  Four other men were also arrested.  It is not clear whether the arrests were related to the council bribery allegations involving Nick Kavanagh and Elliot Lawless (see above).  Anderson said he had been interviewed for over six hours by police and bailed to return in a month.  The Labour Party suspended Anderson on news of his arrest.  Liverpool City Council said it would not comment on matters relating to an individual.

Appointment of Commissioners by Robert Jenrick 
On 24 March 2021, Robert Jenrick announced that he will be appointing Commissioners to oversee authority and carry out limited functions of the council for at least 3 years. This was following an investigation, commissioned in December 2020 and led by Max Caller, that found there were "multiple apparent failures" and a "deeply concerning picture of mismanagement" in the council. Jenrick said that the Commissioners might have to take over authority in regeneration, highways and property management if they see no improvement. The acting Mayor of Liverpool, Wendy Simon, and the Chief Executive of the council, Tony Reeves said "The inspector’s report has highlighted several failings, but there is a collective commitment from both councillors and officers to learn from these mistakes." They also said "“A detailed improvement plan is being drawn up and will be implemented in full. We will be open and transparent about the progress we are making on each of the recommendations."

Sites
Municipal Buildings, Liverpool, former Admin Centre.
Liverpool Town Hall Ceremonial HQ.
Calderstones House Recreation and Open Spaces Departments.

References

External links

Liverpool City Council
Ward profile
Capital of Culture 2008
Liberal Democrats in Liverpool
The Labour party in Liverpool
The Liberal Party in Liverpool
The Green Party in Liverpool

 
Liverpool City Region
Metropolitan district councils of England
Local authorities in Merseyside
Mayor and cabinet executives
Local education authorities in England
Billing authorities in England
1974 establishments in England
City Council